Rendezvous is a two-piece band consisting of Itai Simon and Hagai Izenberg from Israel. While the two members consider the genre of their music to be electronic pop (or "electropop"), their music is played live with analog instruments with touches of jazz.

Rendezvous’ music has gained significant popularity on the Internet. On their YouTube channel, Rendezvous has accrued more than 1 million views, especially after the band uploaded videos of their recording sessions. Further, as of August 2011, the band's Facebook page has generated over 21,500 followers. Their EP was downloaded thousands of times and has earned good reviews from different music sites as well as from individual bloggers. In June 2011, the band released "C Sharp", the first single off their debut album. The single was accompanied by 2 remixes by Carl Cox and an animated music video produced by M-I-E studios, London. On September 7, 2011, Rendezvous released a video for the 2nd single from their debut album, "The Murf", animated by Scott Benson. The video had reached nearly 100,000 views in just a week, and was well received around the world, getting rave reviews by sites such as Motiongrapher, CBS News and others. "The Murf" single was also accompanied by 3 remixes by John Digweed, Loverush UK! and Timothy Allan.

Musical style
Rendezvous' music is a mix of electronica and jazz, and the result of a fusion of the two. It can also fall in the experimental music category. The jazz the band plays has been dubbed in music websites as acid jazz, psychedelic jazz and contemporary jazz. Their psychedelic jazz style was inspired mostly by the songs of Pink Floyd, a band Simon loved since childhood.
Rendezvous differs from many other contemporary electronic acts by the fact that their music is actually played and recorded live on analog instruments, rather than produced digitally on computers and digital instruments. This analog approach to music is reflected upon their music, expressed with a warm and enveloping sound, which the band prefers over today's colder, stricter and less round sound.

Musical Influences
Rendezvous' members' musical influences are mostly based on the music they used to listen to at their youth, which they claim to always enjoy going back to listening to once in a while. Amongst the bands that mostly influenced the band, Pink Floyd and Depeche Mode are the two most prominent ones, and their sound is to some extent a merger between that of the two. The list of other acts that influenced the band is very varied and includes (in no particular order): Air, John Williams, King Crimson, Jethro Tull, Royksopp, Led Zeppelin, The Shadows, Jimi Hendrix, Sweet Smoke, Tiesto, Nirvana, Heather Nova, Madonna, Suede, Garbage, Coldplay, Massive Attack, Portishead, Medeski Martin & Wood and Combustible Edison. Izenberg and Simon also state they feel connected to and influenced by the synthpop and electronic pop emerging from the UK in recent years, and to the retro feel that corresponds with the electronic sounds of the eighties.

History

Formation 
Rendezvous’ two members, Itai Simon and Hagai Izenberg, met at the Rimon School of Jazz and Contemporary Music in Israel, where they both took up music. The two met on their first day in Rimon. The name of the band, Rendezvous, was actually inspired by their gathering with other musicians after their fateful meeting in the said school. The band was then formed in 2003.

First releases
On 2004, Rendezvous got together with two friends, also very talented musicians, and produced their first EP. Simon played bass while Izenberg handled Fender Rhodes keyboards. Their friend, Erez Bachar was the drummer, while their other friend who they just called 'Andrei', was the saxophonist.

The band recorded the live session, which they described as “almost entirely improvised on the spot,” during one session spanning one full night, on a non-working holiday, an Israeli memorial day. At that time, since all studios were closed, the musicians found an empty one that evening where they recorded their session in complete isolation.

After recording, they mastered the tracks at Eshel Studios in Tel Aviv. The band then created a website where they uploaded their EP. The website received thousands of visits and music downloads from all over the world. These downloads made them soar to the top of underground band lists. Radio stations in London, the United States and Canada also began to play their music on the air, and many music blogs throughout the web and internet magazines featured their music and wrote about it.
As a sneak peek into their debut album, they uploaded videos of their different studio sessions, all filmed by the renowned Israeli filmmaker, Uzi Adam.

Discography

Live Studio Session (EP) (2004)

C Sharp (Single) (2011)

The Murf (Single) (2011)

Another Round Please (Album) (2012)

Band members’ profiles
Hagai Izenberg was born on March 20, 1978. He started playing the organ when he was only 4 years old and was studying and composing music throughout his childhood.

Hagai studied in Rimon School of Jazz and Contemporary Music, where he met Itai. While choosing the piano as his major instrument, Hagai kept on looking for his own unique sounds which turned out to be vintage analog synthesizers. He now plays Synthesizers for Rendezvous.

The other half of the band, Itai Simon, was born on December 9, 1979. He became interested in music when he was 10 years old and started playing the electric guitar until he reached age 17. From this point onwards, he played bass guitar, which he claimed was his “true calling.” Now, he plays bass for Rendezvous.

Simon was a member of other Israeli rock bands, namely: The Relics (1998), Utopia (1998–2001), Missing Points (2001–2004), The Butterfly Effect (2004–2006) and SugarPlumBaby (2005 to present). He also produces and arranges music and plays bass guitar for other different artists.

Simon teaches at two music schools in Israel: Ulpan Le Muzika - Giv'at Brenner, and Beit Ha'noar - Ra'anana.

References

External links and further reading
  Official Rendezvous Site
  Rendezvous on Reverb Nation
 Rendezvous' Official YouTube channel
 Rendezvous on Bandcamp

Electronic music duos
Musical groups established in 2003
Israeli electronic music groups
Israeli musical duos